Angel Martínez Rotela (born 9 October 1983) is a Paraguayan professional footballer. He played as a defender for clubs in Argentina, Chile, Paraguay and Spain. He later worked as a manager.

Managerial career
In October 2019, Angel Martínez resigned as manager of Atyrá F.C.

References

External links
 
 
 

Living people
1983 births
Association football defenders
Paraguayan footballers
Paraguay youth international footballers
Club Olimpia footballers
Club Tacuary footballers
Racing Club de Avellaneda footballers
Club Nacional footballers
Real Valladolid players
12 de Octubre Football Club players
Club Deportivo Universidad Católica footballers
Sport Colombia footballers
Sportivo Trinidense footballers
Paraguayan expatriate footballers
Expatriate footballers in Chile
Expatriate footballers in Argentina
Expatriate footballers in Spain
Guaireña F.C. managers